Sparganothoides morata is a species of moth of the family Tortricidae. It is found in Panama, Venezuela and Trinidad.

The length of the forewings is 5.8–6 mm for males and 5.9–7.1 mm for females. The ground colour of the forewings is mainly brownish yellow to brownish orange, with brownish orange to brown speckling. The hindwings are brownish grey to grey. Adults have been recorded on wing from October to March, probably in multiple generations per year.

References

Moths described in 1913
Sparganothoides